Charged multivesicular body protein 6 is a protein that in humans is encoded by the CHMP6 gene.

References

External links

Further reading